Carapo District is one of four districts of the  Huanca Sancos Province in Peru.

Geography 
Other mountains are listed below:

 Misa Rumi
 Parya Muqu
 Pincha Urqu
 Qala Qala
 Urqu Pata

Ethnic groups 
The people in the district are mainly indigenous citizens of Quechua descent. Quechua is the language which the majority of the population (84.37%) learnt to speak in childhood, 15.46% of the residents started speaking using the Spanish language (2007 Peru Census).

See also 
 Ñawpallaqta
 Q'illumayu

References